Pasha Patel is a former member of the Maharashtra Legislative Council. He is from the Bharatiya Janata Party.

Political career
Patel began his political career with the Shetkari Sanghatana and was affiliated with the Nationalist Congress Party. Later, during 2001, he joined the Bharatiya Janata Party and the leader at the time, Gopinath Munde, due to differences with Sharad Joshi. Later he was selected as a member of the Maharashtra Legislative Council for Latur.

References

Marathi politicians
Bharatiya Janata Party politicians from Maharashtra
Nationalist Congress Party politicians from Maharashtra
People from Latur
People from Maharashtra
Members of the Maharashtra Legislative Council
Living people
Year of birth missing (living people)
People from Marathwada